Folk Songs of the Macedonian Bulgarians is an ethnographic collection of folk songs collected by Stefan Verković, considered to be his most valuable contribution in the field of Bulgarian folklore. It was published in Serbian in 1860, in Belgrade.

Background 
The book contains 335 folk songs that are lyrical and were therefore called female by Verković. The songs were collected by him during his time as a Serbian ethological agent in then-Ottoman town of Serres (today in Greece). The collected material was from the eastern parts of the Macedonian region. The title, preface, notes and explanations of the songs are in Serbian, and at the end there is an explanation of some unknown words in Serbian. However, the songs are in their original form. In the preface, Verković states that he called the songs "Bulgarian" as opposed to Slavic because "if you ask a Macedonian Slav "What are you?", he will immediately answer to you: "I am Bulgarian and I call my language Bulgarian". He also clarifies that the Macedonian Bulgarians were formerly called Slavs in the books of Cyril and Methodius and their disciples, and only later in the First Bulgarian Empire, did they adopt the name "Bulgarian", which was more a political and state name, rather than an ethnic name.<ref>Bulgarian researchers of ethnonyms reasonably assume that during the First Bulgarian Empire the ethnonym "Bulgarian" developed a social meaning of "master", i.e. "nobleman", opposite to the ethnonym "Slav", which meant  "peasant", and so "Bulgarian" became a political name. (Веркович 1860 , XIII). сп. Български език, Том 48, Институт за български език. Издателство на Българската академия на науките, 2000, стр. 40.</ref> Verković states that he was planning to publish a second volume of the collection. Due to his involvement in the Veda Slovena debate, he was unable to publish the second volume and the materials he collected were published as "Сборникъ Верковича. Ι. Народныя пѣсни македонскихъ болгаръ" (Verković's Collection. Folk Songs of the Macedonian Bulgarians) in 1920 in Petrograd.

 Publications 
Although Verković didn't describe in his collection any presence of Macedonian identity then, in 1961 the book was re-published by Kiril Penušliski in Skopje under the title "Македонски народни песни" (Macedonian Folk Songs). All references to 'Macedonian Bulgarians' and the original foreword explaining the Bulgarian ethnicity of the Macedonian Slavs were removed from the book. According to Bulgarian sources, its goal was: "the obliteration of the Bulgarian historical and collective memory and building a new Macedonian national identity on its place."''

The book was re-published for the second time in Bulgarian by Petar Dinekov in 1966. In addition to the original text, a translation into Bulgarian of Verković's preface was made and an introductory study was added.

See also 
 Veda Slovena
 Bulgarian Folk Songs
 Political views on the Macedonian language

References

External links 
Народне песме македонски бугара  - Београдъ 1860 – US archive, Stanford libraries (full scanned copy)
Народни песни на македонските българи. Под ред. на Т. Моллов. Варна, LiterNet, 2007

Bulgarian folklore
Serbian books
1860 books